Caren Norden is a German biophysicist who is Deputy Director for Science at the Instituto Gulbenkian de Ciência. She works as a group leader at the Max Planck Institute of Molecular Cell Biology and Genetics. Her research considers the cell biology of tissue morphogenesis.

Early life and education 
Norden was an undergraduate student in biochemistry at the University of Hanover. She worked in the laboratory of Bettina Winckler in the Mount Sinai Health System. In 2006, Norden earned her doctorate from ETH Zurich. She moved to the Institute of Physiology at the University of Cambridge.

Research and career 
Norden was made a group leader at the Max Planck Institute of Molecular Cell Biology and Genetics (MPI-CBG) in 2010. She was elected to the European Molecular Biology Organization in 2020.

Norden's research considers the neural processes that underpin the formation of the vertebrate eye, retinal neurogenesis and lamination. Nodren makes use of zebrafish as a model organism. She uncovered the importance of the positions of cell nuclei in the correct formation of a retina.

Selected publications

References

Living people
University of Hanover alumni
ETH Zurich alumni
German biophysicists
21st-century German scientists
Year of birth missing (living people)